The Ulrichshorn (3,925 m) is a mountain of the Swiss Pennine Alps, overlooking Saas-Fee in the canton of Valais. It is located north of the Nadelhorn, in the Mischabel range, which lies between the Mattertal and the Saastal.

References

External links

 Ulrichshorn on SummitPost
 Ulrichshorn on Hikr

Mountains of the Alps
Alpine three-thousanders
Mountains of Valais
Mountains of Switzerland
Three-thousanders of Switzerland